Newton is a hamlet in the parish of Lanhydrock, Cornwall, England.

References

Hamlets in Cornwall